(3 March 1979—31 January 2018) was a member of the Japanese J-pop group ET-King.

Biography
Itokin was born in Sanda, Hyōgo. He graduated from Uenodai Junior High School and Arima High School, and attended college.

Career
In 1999 he became a member of a band, performing as the lead guitarist. He then formed ET-king (a Japanese J-Pop group) with Tenn and Klutch. In 2005, he moved in to a shared home with seven members of ET-King. He was an MC and a producer for the group.

Acting as a leader of ET-King, his roles included track production and composition.

Since October 2012, he served as a personality on the MBS Radio program 'with...Yoru wa Radio to Kimetemasu.

Death
Itokin was diagnosed with cancer in July 2017. He died from cancer at age 38 on 31 January 2018.

Filmography

Advertisements

References

Japanese male musicians
1979 births
2018 deaths
Musicians from Hyōgo Prefecture
Deaths from cancer in Japan